The Associazione per il Software Libero (AsSoLi) is an Italian non-profit association with the primary goal of spreading free software in Italy.

Between 2001 and 2006 AsSoLi was the official Italian associate of the Free Software Foundation Europe.

References

External links
AsSoLi

Free Software Foundation
Science and technology in Italy